Tadatsugu (written 忠次 or 忠嗣) is a masculine Japanese given name. Notable people with the name include:

, Japanese samurai
, Japanese samurai
, Japanese samurai
, Japanese noble
, Japanese samurai and daimyō

Japanese masculine given names